The Women's 10 kilometre classical at the FIS Nordic World Ski Championships 2011 was held on 28 February 2011 at 13:00 CET. A 5 km qualifying event took place on 23 February. The defending world champion was Finland's Aino-Kaisa Saarinen while the defending Olympic champion (on freestyle) was Sweden's Charlotte Kalla.

Results

Qualification

References

FIS Nordic World Ski Championships 2011
2011 in Norwegian women's sport